Alan Warner is a Scottish writer.

Alan Warner may also refer to:
Alan Warner (cricketer) (born 1957), English cricketer
Alan Warner (musician) (born 1947), English musician